Richmond Art Center is a nonprofit arts organization based in Richmond, California, founded in 1936.

History
In 1936, Richmond-resident Hazel Salmi began teaching classes under the Emergency Education Program (EEP) of the Works Progress Administration (WPA). In 1938, the City of Richmond granted Salmi an old Health Department building to use for classes and exhibitions. Early classes included outdoor sketching, block printing, flower arrangement, color, woodcarving, and leather tooling.

In the 1940s, Salmi and other artists petitioned the City of Richmond to include a permanent art center as part of the new downtown Civic Center development. With funds from a bond measure that specifically funded the art center, the civic center construction plans were the first in the nation to include a community art center. Richmond's Civic Center was designed by architect Timothy Pflueger. The complex, which encompasses City Hall, Hall of Justice, Auditorium, Richmond Art Center, and Public Library, was completed in 1951. The low, linear forms reflect the mid-century modern style of the late 1940s and 1950s.

Richmond Art Center's new facility opened in 1951. Hazel Salmi was director at Richmond Art Center until 1960.

Artist Tom Marioni, sometimes under the pseudonym Allan Fish, served as the Curator of Richmond Art Center from 1968 until 1971. Richmond Art Center became a focal point for West Coast Conceptualism during his time. Notable exhibitions Marioni organized included Paul Kos’ first solo exhibition Participationkinetics (1969). Under Marioni's curatorship, Terry Fox created one of their seminal works, Levitation (1971). In 1971 Marioni was fired by the Head of Parks following a controversial performance by one of Judy Chicago's students that was part of the exhibition California Girls (1971).

For many years Richmond Art Center operated as a division of the City of Richmond's Parks and Recreation Department. In 1950 Richmond Art Center became an independent 501(c)(3) nonprofit.

About 
The Executive Director of Richmond Art Center is José R. Rivera.

Facility
Richmond Art Center's facility is a u-shaped building wrapping around a courtyard garden and public outdoor space. The building has four galleries, including a 2,200 square foot main gallery, as well as six studio and multipurpose spaces. In the courtyard of the building, many sculptures by artist John Roeder (1877-–1964) were installed after his death in 1964.

Classes and arts education
Richmond Art Center provides arts classes for adults, teens, youth and families. On-site classes and workshops are taught in the center's dedicated spaces for ceramics, weaving, metalwork, printing, painting and youth arts. Richmond Art Center also partners with non-profit organizations, community groups and West Contra Costa Unified School District to provide intensive art education programs off-site.

In 2020, COVID-19 shelter-in-place orders temporarily closed Richmond Art Center's facility to the public and the organization launched online arts instruction.

Annual events 
 Student and member exhibitions – since its founding, Richmond Art Center has presented an annual exhibition of work by student and/or member artists. 
 Holiday Arts Festival – some kind of ‘Christmas Sale’ has been a tradition at Richmond Art Center since 1938. The event has been known as the ‘Holidays Arts Festival’ since 1963. 
 WCCUSD Student Show – established in 1966 and organized in partnership with West Contra Costa Unified School District, this annual teacher-curated exhibition presents work by students from middle and high schools in the district. 
 The Art of the African Diaspora – founded in 1997 by artists Jan Hart-Schuyers (died 1998) and Rae Louise Hayward (1950–2008), hosted by the Richmond Art Center for 23 years, the Art of Living Black was a non-juried exhibition and open studios for artists of African descent. The 23rd Art of Living Black presented an exhibition of over 100 works at the Richmond Art Center, as well as Open Studios and Satellite Exhibitions at locations across the Bay Area as well as Open Studios and Satellite Exhibitions at locations across the Bay Area. In 2019, the Steering Committee of artists that had been producing the event announced its new name: Art of the African Diaspora. The first exhibition under the new name was in 2020.

Exhibitions
Below is a list of notable exhibitions at Richmond Art Center.

References

External links 
 Richmond Art Center website
 Art of the African Diaspora on Bay Area Art Beat

Arts organizations based in the San Francisco Bay Area
Arts organizations established in 1936
Non-profit organizations based in the San Francisco Bay Area
501(c)(3) organizations
1936 establishments in California
Richmond, California